A Sainted Devil is a 1924 American silent drama film directed by Joseph Henabery and starring Rudolph Valentino. The film was produced by Adolph Zukor and Jesse Lasky.

Plot
As described in a review in a film magazine, in accordance with custom, Castro arranges the marriage of his son, Don Alonzo (Valentino), with Julietta (Helena D'Algy), the daughter of a proud Spanish family, and she comes to the South American state for the wedding. Carlotta (Naldi), daughter of the major domo, is jealous and with her father arranges with a bandit, El Tigre (Siegmann), who loots the estate on the Don's wedding night and kidnaps Julietta. The Don goes to her rescue, but believes she is unfaithful when he sees El Tigre embracing Carlotta, who is wearing Julietta's mantilla. The Don becomes disgusted with women and seeks to become revenged on El Tigre. Julietta and Carmelita (Lagrange), a dancer, escape and Julietta goes to a convent. Finally the Don meets El Tigre and his friend, Don Luis (Antonio D'Algy), stabs him in a fight. Carmelita, who loves the Don, hides the truth, but eventually takes him to Carmelita and they begin life anew together.

Cast

Reception
A Sainted Devil was not very well received by Photoplay, saying the film "lacks force, as well as the charm of Monsieur Beaucaire. There are several reasons. Rex Beach's romance has been clumsily told and Rudy himself isn't real in his stressed emotional moments," concluding with "the story gets involved in inessentials and misses anything like a big sensation."

Preservation
With no prints of A Sainted Devil located in any film archives, it is a lost film.

See also
 List of lost films

References

External links

Lobby cards and stills at silenthollywood.com
Still at silentfilmstillarchive.com

1924 films
1924 drama films
1924 lost films
Silent American drama films
American silent feature films
American black-and-white films
Famous Players-Lasky films
Films directed by Joseph Henabery
Films shot in New York City
Lost American films
Paramount Pictures films
Films based on works by Rex Beach
Lost drama films
1920s American films